The Next War may refer to:

 The Next War (board game), 1978 board wargame
 "The Next War" (poem), 1917 poem by Wilfred Owen